Big Brother Australia 14, also known as Big Brother Australia 2022, is the fourteenth season of the Australian reality television series Big Brother. The season was filmed from 12 October through 13 December 2021, and premiered on Seven Network on 9 May 2022. Hosted by Sonia Kruger, the season saw new housemates compete against returning housemates deemed as "Big Brother Royalty".

In the series, the Housemates will live in a house together with no communication with the outside world as they competed for $250,000. They were constantly filmed during their time in the house and were not permitted to communicate with those filming them. Over the course of the competition, housemates will compete in challenges for power and safety before voting each other out of the house. When three housemates remained, the Australian public decided which finalist would win the grand prize of $250,000.

The series was won by season 3 winner Reggie Sorensen, who defeated Johnson Ashak and Taras Hrubyj-Piper in the final public vote. With her win, Sorensen became the first person to win the Australian adaptation of the show twice, and the fifth worldwide. The season finale was aired on 12 July 2022, with 363 thousand viewers tuning in.

Production
In October 2021, Seven Network released a promotional teaser for the season with the slogan "Back to the Future," revealing that former housemates from previous seasons of Big Brother would return to compete against new housemates. The season was filmed at the White Pavilion in Sydney Olympic Park, the same location as Big Brother VIP, making it the first civilian season to be filmed in the new location, following the demolition of the previous house in January 2021.

The finale was  broadcast live from the Hordern Pavilion with all housemates in attendance - which will be the first time since moving to Seven that the show has reunited the full cast due to previous seasons having issues with COVID-19 restrictions in Sydney.

International broadcast
The season is being broadcast in New Zealand via TVNZ Ondemand the day after the episode first airs in Australia, and is then being broadcast on one of TVNZ's linear channels the day after that. The season was originally being broadcast on TVNZ 2, but following poor ratings it was moved to TVNZ Duke airing at mid-day from May 25.

Format
Big Brother 14 airs three nights a week from Monday to Wednesday. Each week, two Housemates will typically be Evicted. For the first time since the 2020 revival, significant additions were made to the Big Brother game structure.

Each episode will showcase highlights from the house and house tasks (to determine the shopping budget for the week as well as to award various luxuries) and the Nomination and Eviction process. Regarding the nomination and eviction process, each night features a different episode format. While some episodes modify the format slightly, the typical episode structure is as follows:

 Monday: The Housemates compete in a Nomination Challenge, the winner of which has power over the next set of Nominations. Immediately after the challenge, the challenge winner will be called to the Diary Room to name three nominees for that Night's Eviction Ceremony. At the Eviction Ceremony all housemates must vote to evict one of the three nominees, except the nominating housemate (who will only cast a tie-breaker vote, if required). The nominee with the most votes is evicted from the house.

 Tuesday: The housemates compete in an Immunity Challenge, the winner is immune from the next set of Nominations. Then the House will participate in  House Nominations, with all housemates voting for one Housemate to be nominated for the next Eviction. The three Housemates with the most votes are nominated for eviction. In the event of a tie, the Immunity winner will break the tie to determine three nominees.

 Wednesday: The Housemates nominated by the house compete in the Second Chance Challenge, with the winner saving themself from that night's Eviction Ceremony. At the Eviction Ceremony all housemates must vote to evict one of the two remaining nominees, except the nominees themselves (as their votes would cancel the other's out). In the event of a tie, the Head of House will break the tie. The nominee with the most votes is evicted from the house.

Finale
Following the final eviction, the remaining three housemates will face Australia's vote to determine the winner. This vote is conducted on the show's website, with voters voting for a winner with the finalist with the most votes winning.

Head of House 
Introduced in Week 2 was the title of "Head of House". The house will elect an HoH, who will be given total immunity for the week and access to the HOH Suite along with two/three housemates of their choice. They were also granted a unique game power to use during their reign. No Housemate can be Head of House in back to back weeks.

Voting history 
 Colour key
 Won the title of Head of House
 Selected by Head of House to gain access to the Suite
 Eligible to become Head of House
 Not in the House at the time when the Head of House was decided
 Was not eligible to become Head of House

Notes

Housemates
Twenty-one Housemates competed in the series. The first five new housemates and the eight returning housemates were announced on 7 April 2022, with the remaining 6 of the initial cast being revealed ahead of the launch. The identities of the intruders (new housemates), were revealed on 26 May, ahead of their entrance on Episode 11.

New Housemates

Returning Housemates

Episodes

Voting history
Key
 This housemate was nominated for eviction.
 This housemate was the nominating Housemate on this round.
 This housemate was immune from this round of eviction due to a twist.
 This housemate won the challenge and is immune for this round of eviction. 
 This housemate was not in the Main House and did not participate in this round of eviction.
 This housemate was originally nominated but won the second chance challenge and was thus saved from eviction.
 This housemate was Head of House and was given immunity for the week.

Notes

Ratings
Ratings data is from OzTAM and represents the viewership from the 5 largest Australian metropolitan centres (Sydney, Melbourne, Brisbane, Perth and Adelaide). Total audience based on Metro and Regional ratings, 7 day time shifts and BVOD ratings.

References

External links 

2022 Australian television seasons
14